Borun Rural District is in Eslamiyeh District of Ferdows County, South Khorasan province, Iran. At the National Census of 2006, its population (as a part of the Central District) was 2,048 in 760 households. There were 1,835 inhabitants in 719 households at the following census of 2011. At the most recent census of 2016, the population of the rural district was 1,721 in 687 households. The largest of its 40 villages was Borun, with 644 people.

After the census, Eslamiyeh District was established by combining Baghestan Rural District, Borun Rural District, and the city of Eslamiyeh. At the same time, Baghestan-e Olya's name changed to Baghestan and was raised to the level of a city. Baghestan-e Sofla became the new capital of Baghestan Rural District.

References 

Ferdows County

Rural Districts of South Khorasan Province

Populated places in South Khorasan Province

Populated places in Ferdows County